Re:BIRTH is the first Korean-language studio album by South Korean boy group NU'EST. It was released on July 9, 2014, by Pledis Entertainment.

The album was a commercial success peaking at number 5 on the Gaon Album Chart. The album has sold over 12,459 physical copies as of September 2014.

Promotion

Live performance
The group made their first comeback performance on July 11, 2014 on KBS' Music Bank, followed by MBC's Music Core and SBS's Inkigayo on July 12, 2014 and July 13, 2014.

Single 
"Good Bye Bye" was released as the title track in conjunction with the album on July 9, 2014.

Commercial performance 
Re:BIRTH entered and peaked at number 5 on the Gaon Album Chart on the chart issue dated July 6–12, 2014. In its second week, the album fell to number 14 and to number 42 in its third week. In its fourth and final week, the album climbed to number 36. The album entered at number 13 on the chart for the month of August 2014 with 11,105 physical copies sold. The album also charted at number 66 in August with 834 copies and at number 100 in September with 520 copies. The album sold 12,459 physical copies in 2014.

Track listing

Charts

Album chart

Sales and certifications

Music Show charts

References

NU'EST albums
2014 albums
Hybe Corporation albums